The 2007 Illinois State Redbirds football team represented Illinois State University as a member of the Gateway Football Conference during the 2007 NCAA Division I FCS football season. Led by eighth-year head coach Denver Johnson, the Redbirds compiled an overall record of 4–7 with a mark of 2–4 in conference play, tying for fifth place in the Gateway. Illinois State played home games at Hancock Stadium in Normal, Illinois.

Schedule

References

Illinois State
Illinois State Redbirds football seasons
Illinois State Redbirds football